The sixth season of the American television comedy series Rules of Engagement initially received a 24-episode order and was set to debut on Saturday, October 15, 2011, but relocated to Thursdays due to the low ratings developing from How to Be a Gentleman. After CBS announced the two comedies would swap timeslots, they set the Season 6 debut as October 20, 2011 at 8:30 PM.

Effective January 12, 2012, CBS removed Rules of Engagement from its Thursday lineup, replacing it with the new sitcom Rob starring Rob Schneider.  CBS announced that Rules would return to its Thursday 8:30 PM time slot at a later date. After Rob'''s run of its initial eight episode order, Rules'' returned March 29 for eight weeks of new episodes. Thus, the sixth season was cut from 24 episodes to 15.

Cast

Main cast
 Patrick Warburton as Jeff Bingham
 Megyn Price as Audrey Bingham
 Oliver Hudson as Adam Rhodes
 Bianca Kajlich as Jennifer Morgan
 David Spade as Russell Dunbar
 Adhir Kalyan as Timmy Patel

Recurring cast
 Diane Sellers as Doreen
 Wendi McLendon-Covey as Liz
 Sara Rue as Brenda

Episodes

Ratings

References

2011 American television seasons
2012 American television seasons

it:Episodi de Le regole dell'amore (quinta stagione)